Seán Cahill (born 26 April 1967) is an Irish former athlete who specialised in the high hurdles. He represented his country at the 1996 Summer Olympics as well as two World Championships.

His personal bests are 13.66 seconds in the 110 metres hurdles (-1.6 m/s, Sestriere 1993) and 8.16 seconds in the 60 metres hurdles (Stockholm 1996).

International competitions

References

1967 births
Living people
Irish male hurdlers
Athletes (track and field) at the 1996 Summer Olympics
Olympic athletes of Ireland
World Athletics Championships athletes for Ireland